Redish is a surname. Notable people with the surname include:

Angela Redish, Canadian economist
Janice Redish (fl. 1979–2001), American writer
Martin Redish, American legal scholar

English-language surnames